Lane Barrett (born 17 October 1964) is a Canadian freestyle skier. He competed in the men's moguls event at the 1992 Winter Olympics.

References

External links
 

1964 births
Living people
Canadian male freestyle skiers
Olympic freestyle skiers of Canada
Freestyle skiers at the 1992 Winter Olympics
Skiers from Calgary